Niebergall is a surname and may refer to:
 Buschi Niebergall (1938–1990), German free jazz musician
 Charlie Niebergall (1899–1982), American Baseball player
 Ernst Elias Niebergall (1815–1843), German writer and playwright
 Julia Lee Niebergall (1886–1968), American musician and composer